Stuart Davis (born 24 August 1973) is an English professional golfer.

Davis turned professional unusually late in life, in 2001. He soon earned a place on the second-tier Challenge Tour, where he played for several years with some success, including three runner-up finishes. In 2008, he was runner-up at the Kazakhstan Open; this ultimately earned Davis a place on the European Tour for 2009 as he took the 20th and final place in the standings, thanks to a missed putt by rival Marco Ruiz. However, his debut season was unsuccessful and he returned to the lower tier.

Playoff record
Challenge Tour playoff record (0–1)

See also
2008 Challenge Tour graduates

References

External links

English male golfers
European Tour golfers
People from Heanor
Sportspeople from Derbyshire
Sportspeople from Derby
1973 births
Living people